This article provides two lists:
A list of National Basketball Association players by total career regular season leaders in blocking shots. Blocked shots were first officially recorded in the NBA during the 1973–74 season. 
A progressive list of blocked shots leaders showing how the record has increased through the years.

Blocks leaders
This is a list of National Basketball Association players by total career regular season leaders in blocking shots.
Statistics accurate as of March 16, 2023.

Progressive list for blocks
This is a progressive list of blocked shot leaders showing how the record has increased through the years.
Statistics accurate as of March 16, 2023.

See also
Basketball statistics
NBA regular season records

Notes

References

External links
Basketball-Reference.com enumeration of NBA career leaders in blocked shots
National Basketball Association official website enumeration of NBA career leaders in blocks

National Basketball Association lists
National Basketball Association statistical leaders